Hotan Cultural Museum or Hetian Cultural Museum is a museum in Hotan, Xinjiang, China. Founded in 1995, it has a range of silk fragments, wooden utensils and jewelry, and mummified corpses of a 10-year-old girl and a 35-year-old man with Eurasian faces, believed to be over 1,500 years old.

See also
 List of museums in China
Melikawat

References

Hotan
Museums in Xinjiang
Decorative arts museums in China
Tourist attractions in Xinjiang
Museums established in 1995
1995 establishments in China